Eupithecia megaproterva is a moth in the family Geometridae. It is found in Japan and Taiwan.

References

Moths described in 1988
megaproterva
Moths of Asia